Saifabad is one of the major suburbs in Hyderabad, Telangana, India.

The Ravindra Bharathi auditorium is located here.

Transport
TSRTC runs the buses to this suburb, connecting it to all parts of the city. The closest MMTS train station is at Lakdi ka Pul

References

Neighbourhoods in Hyderabad, India